Jean-Marie Kersauson de Goasmelquin (also spelled Kersauzon and Goasmelquen)  was a French Navy officer. He fought in the War of American Independence, and took part in the French operations in the Indian Ocean under Suffren.

Biography 
After the  Battle of Negapatam, Suffren reshuffled his captains, notably appointing  Beaulieu, captain of Bellone, to Brillant. After Pierrevert, Bellone 's new captain, was killed in the action of 12 August 1782, Suffren returned Beaulieu to Bellone. To replace Beaulieu on Brillant, he appointed Lieutenant de Kersauson captained Brillant.

At the Battle of Trincomalee, from 25 August to 3 September 1782, Brillant was the only ship to return from the vanguard to support the French main battle body, as ordered. However, he failed to seize the opportunity to engage the British from point-blank range, instead taking a position behind Illustre. 

Kersauson was promoted to Captain on 31 July 1784.

Sources and references 
 Notes

References

 Bibliography
 
 
 

French Navy officers